The Police Service (Volunteer Police) Amendment Act 1992 was an Act of the Parliament of New South Wales, Australia, establishing a trial of volunteer police officers in the New South Wales Police Service. Introduced to the Parliament by the Liberal Government, the Act was strongly opposed by the Labor Opposition and the New South Wales Police Association.

The Act was automatically repealed by virtue of a sunset clause on 31 December 1994.

Background 

The United Kingdom and Canada have long histories of allowing volunteers to serve on a part-time basis alongside regular constables in their special constabularies and auxiliary constabularies respectively. The intention of the Police Service (Volunteer Police) Amendment Act 1992 was to adapt the principle of voluntary part-time police service for New South Wales.

The volunteer police 

The Act established the position of 'police volunteer' within the Police Service and collected these volunteers under the title 'the volunteer police'. The Commissioner of Police was given the powers to appoint, discipline and dismiss police volunteers and also to determine their functions, with the requirement that police volunteers be under the supervision of police officers at all times.

Appointment as a police volunteer conferred on a person the same powers and privileges of a special constable appointed under the Police (Special Provisions) Act 1901, which gave the police volunteer the same powers as a constable employed by the Police Service. However, while the Commissioner could determine what weapons were to be carried by police volunteers, the Act specifically prohibited them carrying or using firearms.

Debate 

There was much parliamentary debate on the Act. When the Opposition called a division, the vote was split evenly and the Speaker of the Legislative Assembly used his casting vote to resolve the matter in the affirmative.

Support 

Supporters of the Act - members of the Liberals and the Democrats - argued that volunteer police would build upon the community policing practices implemented by the Government, would augment police in the event of an emergency, and would allow members of the public to contribute to a cause which they felt strongly about.

Opposition 

The Labor Opposition, backed by the principal unions in the Police Service - the New South Wales Police Association, the Commissioned Police Officers Association of New South Wales, and the Public Service Association - was opposed to the Act. Arguments against the Act revolved around concerns that police volunteers would not be sufficiently trained, experienced or equipped for police work, and that the Government intended on tricking the public into thinking there were more police officers on the streets than was actually the case.

Successor scheme 

In 1995, the NSW Police Service introduced a scheme called Volunteers in Policing which allows community members to assist police by performing certain non-core police duties. Such duties are limited to community engagement and basic administrative tasks, with no law enforcement responsibilities or powers granted to volunteers.

References

External links 
 NSW Parliamentary Counsel's Office - Full text of the Act.
 NSW Parliament Hansard - Parliamentary debate records relating to the Act.
 Volunteers in Policing - The current scheme whereby volunteers can perform non-policing functions within the Police Force.

1992 in Australian law
New South Wales Police Force
New South Wales legislation
1990s in New South Wales